The Australian greyhound racing live baiting scandal is a series of events that occurred in at least three Australian states where live baiting of racing greyhounds was exposed on ABC TV and in The Sydney Morning Herald. On 16 February 2015, the Australian television current affairs program Four Corners revealed the use of live piglets, possums and rabbits to train racing greyhounds had been occurring over some years, despite self-regulatory efforts to address the issue. The revelation led to suspensions, inquiries, widespread condemnation of the practice, and, following an inquiry, to the banning of greyhound racing in New South Wales from July 2016, and consequently, the Australian Capital Territory as well. The NSW ban was reversed on 11 October 2016, with conditions.

Background

Greyhound racing is an organized, competitive sport in which greyhound dogs are raced around a track, chasing a mechanical lure over a fixed distance. Historically, the sport is based on the principle of coursing. It is a legalised form of gambling in many jurisdictions. Some greyhound trainers believe that greyhounds will chase better, and hence have a greater chance of winning the race, if they have chased and caught a live animal during training. The live bait animal is either attached to the mechanical lure, dragged in front of the greyhound, or thrown to it. The greyhound will often maim or kill the bait animal, resulting in death.

Controversy
The greyhound industry and the law provide harsh penalties for the use of live baits in training. Nevertheless, accusations of live baiting in the Australian greyhound industry have arisen from time to time.

On 16 February 2015, Four Corners exposed live baiting on training tracks in Queensland, New South Wales and Victoria. The program included graphic surveillance footage, filmed by pro-animal activists, that showed various small animals being tied to mechanical lures where they were chased, caught and attacked by greyhounds for up to 30 minutes. Some animals had young taken and given to the dogs. The program also included interviews with many leading greyhound trainers and administrators who denied the practice of live baiting; some of them were subsequently shown to be involved in the live baiting.

The program’s graphic content drew immediate and widespread criticism from animal protection groups and the wider community.

National Party member of parliament and minister Barnaby Joyce criticised activists who apparently trespassed to record video of live baiting by trainers.

Reactions

Australian Capital Territory 
 After announcement of the intended NSW ban, Chief Minister Andrew Barr stated that greyhound racing would be banned in the ACT

New South Wales
Five registered participants were immediately stood down
The Greyhound Racing NSW board was dismissed and the Chief Executive Officer, Brent Hogan, stood aside
Former High Court of Australia judge Michael McHugh was appointed to lead a review of the industry
Following the McHugh inquiry, the Premier announced on 7 July 2016 that greyhound racing would be banned in NSW from 1 July 2017

On 2 August a rally opposing the ban was held at Hyde Park, Sydney. On 5 August 2016 an alliance of greyhound racing groups took the matter to the Supreme Court of NSW in pursuit of a declaration that the inquiry report was invalid. After running newspaper advertisements supporting the ban, the NSW Government was criticised by Brenton Scott, the chief executive of the Greyhound Breeders, Owners and Trainers Association. Luke Foley, NSW Labor leader, led his party's opposition to the ban. In August 2016 legislation was introduced into the NSW Legislative Assembly and three National MPs crossed the floor to vote against the government; with one Liberal MP abstaining from the vote. Despite these protests, the legislation passed the lower house.

On 11 October 2016 the reversal of the NSW ban was announced, with several conditions. 

In the wake of the NSW greyhound racing ban, the NSW Government established the Greyhound Welfare and Integrity Commission (GWIC) separating the regulatory, welfare and integrity aspects of NSW greyhound racing from the business, commercial and marketing responsibilities which continue under Greyhound Racing New South Wales (GRNSW).

Queensland
13 trainers are under investigation; 6 have been suspended
Macro Meats withdrew its sponsorship of the sport
Jonathan Brown resigned as an ambassador
One trainer was removed from the Racing Queensland Hall of Fame
The racing industry integrity officer was stood down
All Racing Queensland boards dismissed
 Tom Noble, on whose race track the live baiting was occurring, pleaded guilty and was sentenced on 6 September 2016 to 15 counts of serious animal cruelty. Serious Animal cruelty in the QLD Criminal Code attracts a maximum penalty of 7 years and yet Noble only received a 3 year wholly suspended sentence. The QLD Attorney-General, Yvette D'Ath, announced her decision to appeal the sentence on the grounds it was manifestly inadequate. Tom Noble appeared in the appeals court on 17 March 2017. The decision is yet to be announced.

South Australia
 Greyhound Racing SA immediately announced that anyone found to be engaging in the practice would be banished from the sport and prosecuted where possible. The chief executive said that he had no evidence that live baiting was happening in South Australia but "we take little comfort from that because our monitoring processes aren't dissimilar from the eastern seaboard... We shouldn't be satisfied that our monitoring is working – I think we need to accept that, quite clearly". The relevant state government ministers, RSPCA, police and Greyhound Racing SA met to consider a response, including possible changes to legislation to facilitate investigation and be tougher to prevent live baiting.

Tasmania
 The state government indicated a parliamentary inquiry would be held into the sport. In addition the states Chief Veterinarian and Director of Racing launched a joint inquiry.

Victoria
The Victorian Government announced two separate investigations
15 trainers have been suspended pending an investigation, including former administrators and a Trainer of the Year
The chairman of Greyhound Racing Victoria resigned

References

Greyhound racing live baiting
Animal welfare in greyhound racing
Greyhound racing in Australia
Baiting (blood sport)
Animal cruelty incidents
Animal killing